William N Fazackerley (born 19 June 1998) is a former English  cricketer. He made his first-class debut for Leicestershire in the 2017 County Championship on 5 July 2017. Fazackerley retired from cricket in January 2018.

References

External links
 

1998 births
Living people
English cricketers
Guernsey cricketers 
Leicestershire cricketers
English cricketers of the 21st century